The Territorial Prelature of Yauyos is a Roman Catholic territorial prelature located in the city of Yauyos in the Ecclesiastical province of Lima in Peru.

History
 On 12 April 1957, the Territorial Prelature of Yauyos was established from the Metropolitan Archdiocese of Lima

Bishops

Ordinaries
 Prelates of Yauyos (Roman rite)
 Ignacio María de Orbegozo y Goicoechea (April 12, 1957 – April 26, 1968), appointed Bishop of Chiclayo
 Luis Sánchez-Moreno Lira (April 26, 1968 – March 2, 1996), appointed Archbishop of Arequipa
 Juan Antonio Ugarte Pérez (March 15, 1997 – November 29, 2003), appointed Archbishop of Cuzco
 Ricardo García García (October 12, 2004 – Present)

Auxiliary bishop
Juan Antonio Ugarte Pérez (1991-1997), appointed Prelate here

Other priest of this prelature who became bishop
José María Ortega Trinidad, appointed Prelate of Juli in 2006

References
 GCatholic.org
 Catholic Hierarchy
  Prelature website (Spanish)

Roman Catholic dioceses in Peru
Roman Catholic Ecclesiastical Province of Lima
Christian organizations established in 1957
Roman Catholic dioceses and prelatures established in the 20th century
Territorial prelatures